William John McCarthy (February 14, 1886 – February 4, 1928) was a professional baseball catcher. He played parts of two seasons in Major League Baseball, for the Boston Beaneaters in 1905 and the Cincinnati Reds in 1907. He attended Fordham University.

External links

Major League Baseball catchers
Boston Beaneaters players
Cincinnati Reds players
Trenton Tigers players
Harrisburg Senators players
Baseball players from Massachusetts
1886 births
1928 deaths